The Polish Independent Highland Brigade was a Polish military unit created in France in 1939, after the fall of Poland, as part of the Polish Army in France. It had approximately 5,000 soldiers trained in mountain warfare and was commanded by General Zygmunt Szyszko-Bohusz. It was named after the region of Podhale in southern Poland.

In February it was assigned to the Anglo-French expeditionary corps prepared to be sent to Finland. Eventually in May and June 1940 it took part in the Allied campaign in Norway and fought with distinction in the Battles of Narvik. After the beginning of hostilities on the Western Front, the brigade was withdrawn to France, where it fought in the defence of Brittany. Disbanded, some of its soldiers were evacuated to Britain and Egypt, while others joined the French resistance.

See also
 Norway–Poland relations
 Podhale Rifles

External links
 The Poles at Narvik

Mountain infantry brigades of Poland
Military units and formations established in 1939
Military units and formations of Poland in World War II